Darrell "Chip" Wadena, Sr. (November 11, 1938 – June 24, 2014) was an Ojibwe, American tribal executive.

Born in White Earth, Minnesota, Wadena grew up in Naytahwaush, Minnesota, and went to school there. He served in the United States Army, worked at the American Crystal Sugar Company, and in construction. Wadena served on as the White Earth Indian Reservation tribal council and as chairman of the tribal council from 1976 to 1996. As tribal chairman, he helped start the Shooting Star Casino on the reservation. In 1996, Wadena was convicted in the United States District Court of bribery, conspiracy, theft, embezzlement, and money laundry, serving two years in prison. Wadena died in Fargo, North Dakota.

Notes

1938 births
2014 deaths
People from Becker County, Minnesota
People from Mahnomen County, Minnesota
Military personnel from Minnesota
Native American leaders
Ojibwe people
Minnesota politicians convicted of crimes